Nandesari is a census town in Vadodara district in the Indian state of Gujarat.

Demographics
 India census, Nandesari had a population of 7259. Males constitute 53% of the population and females 47%. Nandesari has an average literacy rate of 72%, higher than the national average of 59.5%: male literacy is 80%, and female literacy is 62%. In Nandesari, 13% of the population is under 6 years of age. 

Nandesari has a large notified industrial area consisting of large amount of chemical factories. It homes gujarats first GIDC with concrete roads and storm water drains.

References

Cities and towns in Vadodara district